Parischnogaster is a genus of hover wasps from the subfamily Stenogastrinae, a subfamily of eusocial wasps endemic to the Oriental Region which are included in the family Vespidae.

Species
The following species are some of those included within the genus Parischnogaster:

Parischnogaster albofasciata Selis, 2018
Parischnogaster alternata Sakag., 1969
Parischnogaster aurifrons (Smith, 1862)
Parischnogaster carepenteri Selis, 2018
Parischnogaster curvylypeus Selis, 2018
Parischnogaster depressigaster Rohwer, 1919
Parischnogaster giglii Selis, 2015
Parischnogaster gracilipes (Vecht, 1977)
Parischnogaster jacobsoni (R. du Buysson, 1913)
Parischnogaster mellyi (de Saussure, 1852)
Parischnogaster mindanaobis Selis, 2018
Parischnogaster nigerrima Selis, 2018
Parischnogaster nigricans (Cameron, 1902)
Parischnogaster nigricans serrei (R. du Buysson, 1905)
Parischnogaster nigriterga Selis, 2018
Parischnogaster simillima Selis, 2018
Parischnogaster striatula (R. du Buysson, 1905)
Parischnogaster timida (Williams, 1928)
Parischnogaster unicuspata  Reyes, 1988

References

Vespidae
Hymenoptera genera